This article summarises the relationships between various members of the family of Lowther baronets.

Sir Christopher Lowther
Sir John Lowther, of Lowther (d. 1637)
Sir John Lowther, 1st Baronet (1605–1675)
John Lowther (of Hackthorpe)
John Lowther, 1st Viscount Lonsdale
Richard Lowther, 2nd Viscount Lonsdale
Henry Lowther, 3rd Viscount Lonsdale
Anthony Lowther (of Lowther)
William Lowther (of Hackthorpe)
Richard Lowther (died 1703)
Robert Lowther (elder)
James Lowther, 1st Earl of Lonsdale
Robert Lowther (younger)
Ralph Lowther
John Lowther (of Ackworth Park)
Sir Christopher Lowther, 1st Baronet
Sir John Lowther, 2nd Baronet
Sir Christopher Lowther, 3rd Baronet
Sir James Lowther, 4th Baronet
William Lowther (of Swillington, elder)
William Lowther (of Swillington, younger)
Sir William Lowther, 1st Baronet (1663-1729)
Sir William Lowther, 2nd Baronet
Christopher Lowther (d. 1718)
Sir William Lowther, 1st Baronet (1707-1788)
William Lowther, 1st Earl of Lonsdale
William Lowther, 2nd Earl of Lonsdale
Francis William Lowther (illegitimate)
Claude Lowther
Henry Cecil Lowther
Henry Lowther, 3rd Earl of Lonsdale
St George Lowther, 4th Earl of Lonsdale
Hugh Lowther, 5th Earl of Lonsdale
Lancelot Lowther, 6th Earl of Lonsdale
Anthony Lowther, Viscount Lowther
James Lowther, 7th Earl of Lonsdale
Hugh Lowther, 8th Earl of Lonsdale
William Lowther (diplomat)
James Lowther, 1st Viscount Ullswater
Christopher William Lowther
John Arthur Lowther (1910-1942)
Nicholas Lowther, 2nd Viscount Ullswater
Sir Gerard Lowther, 1st Baronet
Cecil Lowther
Sir John Lowther, 1st Baronet (1759-1844)
Sir John Henry Lowther, 2nd Baronet
Sir Charles Hugh Lowther, 3rd Baronet
George William Lowther
Sir Charles Lowther, 4th Baronet
James Lowther (of Wilton Castle)
Robert Lowther (d. 1655)
Anthony Lowther (of Marske)
Sir William Lowther, 1st Baronet (1670-1705)
Sir Thomas Lowther, 2nd Baronet
Sir William Lowther, 3rd Baronet

 
Surnames